Cárlos Cámara Lázaro (9 January 1934 – 24 February 2016) was a Dominican-born Mexican actor.

Biography 
Cámara was born to a family of artists. He migrated to Venezuela where he married the actress Elisa Parejo, with whom he had three children: the actors Carlos Cámara Jr., Víctor Cámara and Lolita Cámara Parejo. The marriage ended in divorce. He later remarried in Mexico and had another daughter, Norma Cámara.

He moved to Mexico in the late 1960s, where he worked in television, cinema and theatre, at that time Carlos got the Mexican nationality. He mostly played antagonist roles.

Cámara died on 24 February 2016. He was 82.

Filmography

Films

Television

Awards and nominations

TVyNovelas Awards

References

External links

1934 births
2016 deaths
20th-century Mexican male actors
Dominican Republic emigrants to Mexico
Mexican male film actors
Mexican male television actors
White Dominicans
21st-century Mexican male actors